The CIWC Tower is a skyscraper office building located in Hsinchu City, Taiwan. As of January 2021, it is the tallest building in Hsinchu City.

Design
The building was designed by the Taiwanese architectural firms Lai & Chao Architects & Associate and Huang Zhengfu Architect & Associates in the postmodern style. The building's design adopts a futuristic sensation by utilising a glass façade.

Location
Situated on the main road between Hsinchu Science Park and Zhubei City, the tower faces Costco Hsinchu Store and is adjacent to the Provincial Highway 68 that connects Zhudong and Hsinchu City.

See also 
 List of tallest buildings in Taiwan
 List of tallest buildings in Taipei
 Wonder World 520

References

2016 establishments in Taiwan
Buildings and structures in Hsinchu
Office buildings completed in 2016
Skyscraper office buildings in Taiwan
Skyscrapers in Hsinchu